Hélio Gonçalves Heleno (18 May 1935 – 4 September 2012) was the Roman Catholic bishop of the Roman Catholic Diocese of Caratinga, Brazil.

Ordained to the priesthood in 1961, he was named bishop in 1978 and retired in 2011.

Gonçalves was the brother of Bishop José Gonçalves Heleno (1927–2021), who served as the Bishop of the Roman Catholic Diocese of Governador Valadares from 1977 to 2001. The two Gonçalves brothers are buried next to each other at the Sao Joao Batista Cathedral in Caratinga.

References

21st-century Roman Catholic bishops in Brazil
1935 births
2012 deaths
20th-century Roman Catholic bishops in Brazil
Roman Catholic bishops of Caratinga